Visual Components is a developer of 3D simulation software for manufacturing. Visual Components software is used for applications including layout planning, production simulation, off-line programming and PLC verification.

History
Visual Components was founded 1999 in Helsinki, Finland. The company philosophy was to make manufacturing design and simulation technology easy to use and accessible to manufacturing organizations of all sizes.

Visual Components’ first product was a layout configuration and visualization tool for JOT Automation, a Finnish supplier of automated test and assembly solutions. Visual Components and KUKA have since released additional software in the fields of robot simulation, programming and 3D design.

In December 2017, KUKA announced the acquisition of Visual Components. Following the announcement, a statement was made by KUKA that Visual Components remain a hardware neutral simulation platform, and would continue to support and expand its list of robot models, currently 1,200+ models from 30+ robot brands.

In November 2022, it was announced Visual Components had acquired the robotics division of the Espoo-headquartered company, Delfoi - a provider of robot offline programming (OLP) software solutions worldwide.

Release history

See also
 Simulation software
 Visualization software
 Discrete event simulation 
 List of discrete event simulation software
 Robotics Simulation Software
 Off-line Programming (robotics)
 Programmable Logic Controller
 Industry 4.0
 Automation

References 

Simulation software
Windows-only software
Robotics simulation software